Redding House is a historic house in Biloxi, Mississippi, U.S.. It was built in 1908 for Charles Redding, a local businessman. It was designed in the Classical Revival architectural style. It has been listed on the National Register of Historic Places since May 18, 1984.

References

Houses on the National Register of Historic Places in Mississippi
Neoclassical architecture in Mississippi
Houses completed in 1908
Buildings and structures in Biloxi, Mississippi
National Register of Historic Places in Harrison County, Mississippi